North Avenue station is a Baltimore Light Rail station located on North Avenue (US 1) near the I-83 interchange in Baltimore, Maryland. The station has two island platforms serving three tracks.

During the light rail's double-tracking project, when the northern section of the system was closed, the North Avenue stop was the northern terminus. The station is the final stop on train headed for the nearby maintenance facility.

Murder case
On November 7, 2006, a 17-year-old girl was murdered after she got off a train at the North Avenue stop in a highly publicized case that highlighted light rail safety. Two teenagers were charged for the crime, which took place during an attempt to rob the victim and her brother. A girl, 16, was sentenced to 25 years in adult prison, while a boy, 15, was tried as an adult but later transferred to juvenile court for sentencing.

References

External links
Station from Google Maps Street View

Baltimore Light Rail stations
Railway stations in Baltimore
Remington, Baltimore